Seven Hours of Violence is a 1973 Italian crime-thriller film. It marked the directorial debut by Michele Massimo Tarantini.

Cast
 George Hilton as George Anderson
 Rosemary Dexter as Helen Karlatis
 Giampiero Albertini as Inspector Athanasiadis
 Steffen Zacharias as  Fastikopulos
 Ernesto Colli as  Tomassian 
 Claudio Nicastro as Kavafris   
 Gianni Musy as Mchael Papadopoulos 
 Greta Vayan as  Greta Bapadopulos
 Iwao Yoshioka as Chinese thug
 George Wang as Chinese thug

References

External links

1973 films
1970s Italian-language films
Films directed by Michele Massimo Tarantini
Italian crime thriller films
1970s crime thriller films
Films scored by Alessandro Alessandroni
1970s Italian films